Cedar Grove Rural Crossroads Historic District is a national historic district located at Cedar Grove, Orange County, North Carolina.  The district encompasses 44 contributing buildings, 9 contributing sites, and 7 contributing structures in the rural crossroads community of Cedar Grove.  The district developed from the mid-19th to mid-20th century, and includes notable examples of Late Victorian and Colonial Revival style architecture.  Notable buildings include the Rogers-McDade House, Eno Presbyterian Church (1897-1899), Cedar Grove Methodist Church (1939), Allison-Oliver-Pender Store (1880s), and Allen A. Ellis Store (1923).

It was listed on the National Register of Historic Places in 1998.

References

Historic districts on the National Register of Historic Places in North Carolina
Colonial Revival architecture in North Carolina
Buildings and structures in Orange County, North Carolina
National Register of Historic Places in Orange County, North Carolina